The ELIZA effect, in computer science, is the tendency to unconsciously assume computer behaviors are analogous to human behaviors; that is, anthropomorphisation.

Overview
In its specific form, the ELIZA effect refers only to "the susceptibility of people to read far more understanding than is warranted into strings of symbols—especially words—strung together by computers". A trivial example of the specific form of the Eliza effect, given by Douglas Hofstadter, involves an automated teller machine which displays the words "THANK YOU" at the end of a transaction. A naive observer might think that the machine is actually expressing gratitude; however, the machine is only printing a preprogrammed string of symbols.

More generally, the ELIZA effect describes any situation where, based solely on a system's output, users perceive computer systems as having "intrinsic qualities and abilities which the software controlling the (output) cannot possibly achieve" or "assume that [outputs] reflect a greater causality than they actually do". In both its specific and general forms, the ELIZA effect is notable for occurring even when users of the system are aware of the determinate nature of output produced by the system. From a psychological standpoint, the ELIZA effect is the result of a subtle cognitive dissonance between the user's awareness of programming limitations and their behavior towards the output of the program. The discovery of the ELIZA effect was an important development in artificial intelligence, demonstrating the principle of using social engineering rather than explicit programming to pass a Turing test.

Origin

The effect is named for the 1966 chatbot ELIZA, developed by MIT computer scientist Joseph Weizenbaum. When executing Weizenbaum's DOCTOR script, ELIZA parodied a Rogerian psychotherapist, largely by rephrasing the "patients replies as questions:

Human: Well, my boyfriend made me come here.
ELIZA: Your boyfriend made you come here?
Human: He says I'm depressed much of the time.
ELIZA: I am sorry to hear you are depressed.
Human: It's true. I'm unhappy.
ELIZA: Do you think coming here will help you not to be unhappy?

Though designed strictly as a mechanism to support "natural language conversation" with a computer, ELIZA's DOCTOR script was found to be surprisingly successful in eliciting emotional responses from users who, in the course of interacting with the program, began to ascribe understanding and motivation to the program's output. As Weizenbaum later wrote, "I had not realized ... that extremely short exposures to a relatively simple computer program could induce powerful delusional thinking in quite normal people." Indeed, ELIZA's code had not been designed to evoke this reaction in the first place. Upon observation, researchers discovered users unconsciously assuming ELIZA's questions implied interest and emotional involvement in the topics discussed, even when they consciously knew that ELIZA did not simulate emotion.

Significance to automated labor 
ELIZA convinced some users into thinking that a machine was human. This shift in human-machine interaction marked progress in technologies emulating human behavior. Two groups of chatbots are distinguished by William Meisel as "general personal assistants" and "specialized digital assistants". General digital assistants have been integrated into personal devices, with skills like sending messages, taking notes, checking calendars, and setting appointments. Specialized digital assistants “operate in very specific domains or help with very specific tasks". Digital assistants that are programmed to aid productivity by assuming behaviors analogous to humans.

Joseph Weizenbaum considered that not every part of the human thought could be reduced to logical formalisms and that “there are some acts of thought that ought to be attempted only by humans”. He also observed that we develop emotional involvement with machines if we interact with them as humans. When chatbots are anthropomorphized, they tend to portray gendered features as a way through which we establish relationships with the technology. "Gender stereotypes are instrumentalised to manage our relationship with chatbots" when human behavior is programmed into machines.

In the 1990s, Clifford Nass and Byron Reeves conducted a series of experiments 
establishing The Media Equation, demonstrating that people tend to respond to media as they would either to another person (by being polite, cooperative, attributing personality characteristics such as aggressiveness, humor, expertise, and gender) – or to places and phenomena in the physical world. 
Numerous subsequent studies that have evolved from the research in psychology, social science and other fields indicate that this type of reaction is automatic, unavoidable, and happens more often than people realize. Reeves and Nass (1996) argue that, “Individuals’ interactions with computers, television, and new media are fundamentally social and natural, just like interactions in real life,” (p. 5).

Feminized labor, or women's work, automated by anthropomorphic digital assistants reinforces an "assumption that women possess a natural affinity for service work and emotional labour". In defining our proximity to digital assistants through their human attributes, chatbots become gendered entities.

See also

 Chatbot
 Duck test
 Intentional stance
 Loebner Prize
 The Media Equation
 Philosophical zombie
 Semiotics
 Turing test
 Uncanny valley

Notes

References
 Hofstadter, Douglas. Preface 4: The Ineradicable Eliza Effect and Its Dangers. (from Fluid Concepts and Creative Analogies: Computer Models of the Fundamental Mechanisms of Thought, Basic Books: New York, 1995)
 Turkle, S., Eliza Effect: tendency to accept computer responses as more intelligent than they really are (from Life on the screen- Identity in the Age of the Internet, Phoenix Paperback: London, 1997)
 ELIZA effect, from the Jargon File, version 4.4.7. Accessed 8 October 2006.
 Byron Reeves & Clifford Nass. The Media Equation: How People Treat Computers, Television, and New Media like Real People and Places, Cambridge University Press: 1996.

Human–computer interaction